State Route 295 (SR 295) is a north–south state highway in northwestern Ohio, a U.S. state. Its southern terminus is an intersection with SR 65 in Grand Rapids.  Its northern terminus is at the Michigan State Line in Berkey.  The roadway continues into Michigan as county-maintained Silberhorn Highway.

Route description

SR 295 exists primarily within Lucas County with a southern terminus just inside the Wood County line.  No portion of this state highway is included within the National Highway System.

History
Designated in 1932, SR 295 was originally routed from its current eastern junction with SR 2 to its current northern terminus at the Michigan State Line in Berkey.
One year later, the highway would be extended southward to SR 64 on the outskirts of Whitehouse. By 1935, SR 295 was extended southward one more time, this time to a southern terminus at US 24. SR 295 was extended to run along the former US 24's alignment until Grand Rapids, where SR 295 then replaced the former SR 578 and terminates at SR-65.

Major intersections

References

External links

295
Transportation in Wood County, Ohio
Transportation in Lucas County, Ohio